Robert Lester (born April 30, 1988) is a former American football safety. He played his college football for the Alabama Crimson Tide, and signed as an undrafted free agent with the Carolina Panthers in 2013.

College career
As a freshman in 2009, Lester played in eight games, recording eight tackles. He played on special teams in the national championship game against Texas, but did not record a tackle. As a sophomore in 2010, Lester took over as a starter and had 52 tackles, eight interceptions, and a sack.

As a junior in 2011, Lester started all 13 games at strong safety during the Crimson Tide's 2011 national championship season. He had 39 tackles, three pass breakups, a forced fumble, one tackle for loss, and a blocked field goal. He intercepted his first pass against Ole Miss and his second against LSU during the regular season. His eight interceptions in his Sophomore year tied Harry Gilmer (1946) for the second most in a single season in Alabama school history.

College career statistics

Professional career

Carolina Panthers
After going undrafted in the 2013 NFL Draft, Lester was signed as a free agent by the Carolina Panthers. He was released on August 31, 2013, during final cuts, but was then signed to the Panthers practice squad the next day. On September 17, 2013, Lester was elevated from the practice squad to the active roster after Charles Godfrey was lost for the season due to injury.
He started at Strong Safety week 3 vs the New York Giants in his first NFL game, and Lester finished with 5 tackles, a pass deflection, a fumble recovery, and an interception. In his rookie season, Lester played in 12 games and started four games. He recorded 21 tackles, three interceptions, four passes defensed and one fumble recovery. Opposing quarterbacks had a 49.6 rating when throwing in Lester's direction in 2013.

He was released on August 30, 2014 for final roster cuts before the start of the 2014 season. He was signed to the team's practice squad the next day. He was promoted to the active roster on October 14.

On September 1, 2015, Lester was released by the Panthers.

References

External links
Carolina Panthers bio
Alabama Crimson Tide bio

1988 births
Living people
American football safeties
Alabama Crimson Tide football players
Carolina Panthers players
People from Foley, Alabama
Players of American football from Alabama